Horgești is a commune in Bacău County, Western Moldavia, Romania. It is composed of eight villages: Bazga, Galeri, Horgești, Mărăscu, Răcătău-Răzeși, Răcătău de Jos, Recea and Sohodor.

References

Communes in Bacău County
Localities in Western Moldavia